Anestis Chatziliadis (born 17 February 1991) is a Greek footballer who plays as a defender for Irodotos.

Career
On 7 September 2016, Chatziliadis signed with Lokomotiv Sofia but was released in June 2017.

In August 2017, Chatziliadis signed with Agrotikos Asteras.

References

External links

1991 births
Living people
Footballers from Thessaloniki
Greek footballers
Association football fullbacks
Iraklis Thessaloniki F.C. players
Tilikratis F.C. players
Agrotikos Asteras F.C. players
Apollon Pontou FC players
AO Chania F.C. players
FC Lokomotiv 1929 Sofia players
Irodotos FC players
Super League Greece players
Football League (Greece) players
Second Professional Football League (Bulgaria) players
Greek expatriate footballers
Expatriate footballers in Bulgaria
Greek expatriate sportspeople in Bulgaria
Doxa Kranoula F.C. players